Cristina Videira Lopes is a Professor of Informatics and Computer Science at University of California, Irvine.
Prior to being a professor, she was a Research Scientist at the Xerox Palo Alto Research Center (PARC). While at PARC, she was most known as a founder of the group that developed Aspect-Oriented Programming (AOP) and started aspectj.org. More recently, she has been working in ubiquitous computing, with a focus in 
communication mechanisms that are pervasive, secure and intuitive for humans to perceive and interact with.

Biography
Lopes received a PhD in Computer Science from Northeastern University in 1998 under Karl Lieberherr and Gregor Kiczales.

List of publications

References

External links

Living people
Year of birth missing (living people)
Northeastern University alumni
University of California, Irvine faculty
Scientists at PARC (company)